The Tortoise and the Hare is one of Aesop's Fables.

The Tortoise and the Hare may also refer to:


Literature
The Tortoise and the Hare (novel) (1954), a novel by English author Elizabeth Jenkins
 Sugungga, a pansori based on the story of The Rabbit and the Tortoise, a Korean folk tale different from Aesop's
The Tortoise & The Hare (2013), a picture book illustrated by Jerry Pinkney

Screen
The Tortoise and the Hare (1935), a short animated Disney film
Tortoise Beats Hare (1941), an animated short Merrie Melodies film starring Bugs Bunny
Tortoise Wins by a Hare (1943), a Merrie Melodies sequel to Tortoise Beats Hare
The Story of The Tortoise & the Hare (2002), directed by Ray Harryhausen
Testudo et Lepus (The Tortoise and the Hare) (2007), an episode of the television series Rome
The Tortoise and the Hare-Brain (2007), an episode of the animated television series Brandy & Mr. Whiskers
Tortoise vs. Hare (2008), a computer animated film from The Jim Henson Company
Kachua Aur Khargosh (2008), or Tortoise and Hare, winner of the Indian National Film Award for Best Non-Feature Animation Film

Music
Tortoise and the Hare (song), a song on the Moody Blues 1970 album A Question of Balance

Games
Hare and Tortoise, a popular board game based on Aesop's fable

Computing
In computer science The Tortoise and the Hare algorithm is another name for Floyd's algorithm for finding a cycle in a sequence of iterated functions

See also 
Achilles and the Tortoise, one of Zeno's paradoxes (Achilles could be replaced by a hare with no change in Zeno's reasoning).